The 2019–20 season was the 48th season of Agrupación Deportiva Alcorcón in existence and the club's 10th consecutive season in the second division of Spanish football. In addition to the domestic league, AD Alcorcón participated in this season's edition of the Copa del Rey. The season was due to cover a period from 1 July 2019 to 30 June 2020. It was extended extraordinarily beyond 30 June due to the COVID-19 pandemic in Spain.

Players

Current squad
The numbers are established according to the official website: www.adalcorcon.com and www.lfp.es

Out on loan

Pre-season and friendlies

Competitions

Overview

Segunda División

League table

Results summary

Results by round

Matches
The fixtures were revealed on 4 July 2019.

Copa del Rey

References

External links

AD Alcorcón seasons
AD Alcorcón